Major General Albemarle Bertie Edward Cator,  (12 April 1877 – 18 November 1932) was a senior British Army officer who served as General Officer Commanding London District and Major-General Commanding the Brigade of Guards.

Military career
Cator was commissioned a second lieutenant in the Scots Guards on 9 June 1897, and was promoted to lieutenant on 17 May 1899. He served with the 1st battalion of his regiment in South Africa during the Second Boer War, and was present at the battles of Belmont, Modder River, and Magersfontein in 1899. The following year, he took part in the march to Bloemfontein and Pretoria, the battles of Diamond Hill and Belfast , and advance to Komatipoort. Following the end of the war in late May 1902, Cator returned home with his regiment in the SS Tagus, which arrived in Southampton in July.

He later served in the First World War, as General Officer Commanding 58th (2/1st London) Division, taking part in the Battle of Passchendaele in 1917. He became Commander of Lucknow District in India in 1927 before becoming General Officer Commanding London District and Major-General Commanding the Brigade of Guards in April 1932.

He lived at Trewsbury near Cirencester and died in a hunting accident in November 1932.

Family
Cator's grandfather, John Barwell Cator, inherited the estates of his uncle John Cator, an MP, landowner and property developer.

In 1903 Albemarle Cator married Violet Eveleen Sutton; they had one son. Following the dissolution of his first marriage, he married Eleanor Gertrude Atherley (née Lumsden) in 1920.

References

 

|-
 

1877 births
1932 deaths
British Army major generals
British Army personnel of the Second Boer War
British Army generals of World War I
Companions of the Order of the Bath
Companions of the Distinguished Service Order
Scots Guards officers